Governors Club is a golf course community and census-designated place (CDP) in Chatham County, North Carolina, United States. It was first listed as a CDP in the 2020 census with a population of 1,969.

It is bordered to the northeast by the Governors Village CDP. The  summit of Edwards Mountain is in the west-central part of the Governors Club CDP.

Demographics

2020 census

Note: the US Census treats Hispanic/Latino as an ethnic category. This table excludes Latinos from the racial categories and assigns them to a separate category. Hispanics/Latinos can be of any race.

References 

Census-designated places in Chatham County, North Carolina
Census-designated places in North Carolina